Three ships of the French Navy have borne the name of Sané, in honour of the 18th-century French engineer Jacques-Noël Sané.

French ship named Sané 
  (1847), a paddle frigate
  (1872), an 
  (1916), a

Notes and references

Notes

References

Bibliography 
 
 

French Navy ship names